Dan Potash (born March 22, 1970) is a TV reporter for AT&T SportsNet Pittsburgh (formerly FSN Pittsburgh and Root Sports Pittsburgh). He covers both the Pittsburgh Penguins of the NHL and the Pittsburgh Pirates of the MLB. He joined the AT&T SportsNet Pittsburgh team in 2000. Prior to joining AT&T SportsNet Pittsburgh, he worked for three years as weekend sports reporter for WCIV-TV in Charleston, South Carolina. Before that, Dan served as the sports director at WDTV in Bridgeport, West Virginia. Dan started his sportscasting career in Southern California, where he was a production assistant for Prime Sports. Potash is well known for an incident in 2008 when former Penguins player Georges Laraque kissed him during a report. On August 17, 2012, Potash confirmed on the ROOTSPORTSPIT Twitter account that he is now engaged to long-time girlfriend Heidi.

Potash has worked with other notable media personalities such as John Fedko, John Sanders, Patti Burns, Joey Kocur, and Adam Curry.

References

National Hockey League broadcasters
Major League Baseball broadcasters
Living people
American sports announcers
Pittsburgh Pirates announcers
Pittsburgh Penguins announcers
College football announcers
College basketball announcers in the United States
1970 births